The 2016 Iranian Super Cup was the second Iranian Super Cup, held on 19 July 2016 between the 2015–16 Persian Gulf Pro League champions Esteghlal Khuzestan and the 2015–16 Hazfi Cup winners Zob Ahan Esfahan.

Match

References

Supercup
2016